{{DISPLAYTITLE:C8H16O3}}
The molecular formula C8H16O3 (molar mass: 160.21 g/mol, exact mass: 160.1099 u) may refer to:

 2-Butoxyethanol acetate
 2,2-Diethoxytetrahydrofuran
 3-Hydroxyoctanoic acid

Molecular formulas